Roy Hamilton (born May 14, 1973) is professor in the departments of Neurology, Psychiatry, and Physical Medicine and Rehabilitation at University of Pennsylvania (Penn). He is the Director of Penn's Laboratory for Cognition and Neural Stimulation (LCNS), and launched the Brain Stimulation, Translation, Innovation, and Modulation Center (brainSTIM) at the University of Pennsylvania in 2020.

Background 
Hamilton obtained his bachelor's degree in Psychology from Harvard University in 1995, and obtained his MD and a master's degree in Health Sciences Technology from Harvard Medical School and Massachusetts Institute of Technology (MIT) in 2001. He completed residency training in Neurology at the University of Pennsylvania in 2005, and pursued a fellowship in Cognitive and Behavioral Neurology at the same institution. He was appointed to the  faculty of Penn's Department of Neurology in 2009.

Hamilton is a board certified neurologist and practicing clinician at the Penn Memory Center.,

Research interests and work 
Hamilton has explored a variety of topics, including plastic changes that occur in the brains of blind individuals, mechanisms of neural recovery in patients who have suffered from strokes, and neuromodulation as a potential tool for enhancing human cognition

The central focus of his research revolves around using noninvasive electrical and magnetic brain stimulation to explore the characteristics and limits of functional plasticity in the intact and injured human brain.

As director of Penn's Laboratory for Cognition and Neural Stimulation, Hamilton leads a team of scientists and clinicians to employ a combination of behavioral measures, advanced neuroimaging, and brain stimulation to investigate the neural basis of cognition, develop and implement therapies for neurological disorders, and to reveal critical behaviorally relevant circuit and network properties of the human brain.

Professional service and honors 
From 2012-2022, he has served as the Assistant Dean for Diversity and Inclusion at the Perelman School of Medicine at the University of Pennsylvania.

In 2017, he was appointed as the inaugural Vice Chair for Diversity and Inclusion in the Department of Neurology at the University of Pennsylvania. Since 2019, Hamilton has served as one of two inaugural Associate Editors for Equity Diversity and Inclusion for the four academic journals published by the AAN: Neurology, Neurology Clinical Practice, Neurology Genetics, and Neurology Immunology and Neuroinflammation.

He was the recipient of the  American Academy of Neurology  Foundation's Norman Geschwind Prize in Behavioral Neurology, and serves as both the Chair of the AAN Behavioral Neurology Section and the President of the Society for Behavioral and Cognitive Neurology. He serves on the editorial boards of Restorative Neurology and Neuroscience, Cognitive and Behavioral Neurology, and Neurobiology of Language. He has been recognized as one of "1,000 inspiring Black scientists in America" by CellPress. In 2022, he was a recipient of the inaugural Chan Zuckerberg Initiative Science Diversity Leadership Award, for scientific investigators who have also been advocates for diversity in science.

brainSTIM Center 
Hamilton launched the Brain Science, Translation, Innovation, and Modulation Center (brainSTIM) at the University of Pennsylvania in 2020. Made up of a team of neuroscientists, neurologists, psychiatrists, psychologists, and engineers, the center has a  cross-disciplinary approach which uses neuromodulation to investigate, remediate, and enhance human brain function.

References

External links 
 UPenn profile
 

Perelman School of Medicine at the University of Pennsylvania faculty
Massachusetts Institute of Technology alumni
Harvard Medical School alumni
Harvard College alumni
1973 births
Living people